Reyan Daskalov (born 10 February 1995) is a Bulgarian professional footballer who plays as a defender or midfielder for CSKA 1948.

Club career

Litex Lovech
Daskalov joined Litex Academy from Levski Ruse, where he had played since he was 8. In 2013, he got called to train with the first team by the manager back then, Hristo Stoichkov and on 19 May 2013 he made his professional debut for the team in a match against Pirin Gotse Delchev.

Chernomorets Burgas loan
On 19 January 2015 he was loaned out to Chernomorets Burgas for the rest of the season. He made his debut for the team on 28 February in a match against PFC Montana.

Return to Litex
After his loan end, he joined back the newly founded second team of Litex in B Group as captain.

Tsarsko Selo
Daskalov started training with the doubles team. Just before the start of the season he was loaned to the newly promoted to the Second League team  Tsarsko Selo and made his debut for the team in the first round.

Club statistics

Club

References

External links

1995 births
Living people
Bulgarian footballers
Bulgaria youth international footballers
First Professional Football League (Bulgaria) players
PFC CSKA Sofia players
PFC Litex Lovech players
PFC Chernomorets Burgas players
FC Tsarsko Selo Sofia players
PFC Beroe Stara Zagora players
Association football midfielders
Sportspeople from Ruse, Bulgaria